Adelaide of Leuven (died ) was the wife of Simon I, Duke of Lorraine (1076–1138), in what is now France. She was the daughter of Henry III of Leuven and his wife Gertrude of Flanders. After the death of her husband, Adelaide retired to Tart Abbey.

The children of Simon I and Adelaide included:
Matthias I, Duke of Lorraine
Robert, Lord of Floranges 
Agatha of Lorraine, wife of Renaud III, Count of Burgundy
Hedwige, wife of Frederick III, count of Toul
Bertha, wife of Margrave Hermann III of Baden
Mathilde, wife of Gottfried I, Count of Sponheim
Baldwin 
John

External links
Adelaide de Louvain

11th-century French women
Year of birth unknown
1150s deaths
Year of death uncertain
Duchesses of Lorraine
Nobility of the Duchy of Brabant
Place of birth unknown
Place of death unknown
11th-century women of the Holy Roman Empire
12th-century women of the Holy Roman Empire